The 2010 FIA GT1 San Luis round was an auto racing event held at the Potrero de los Funes, San Luis, Argentina on 3–5 December 2010, and served as the tenth and final round of the 2010 FIA GT1 World Championship season.  The event shared the weekend with the TC 2000. The pairing of Stefan Mücke and José María López of the Young Driver AMR Aston Martin earned pole position and earned the fastest lap times in all three qualifying sessions thanks to the new addition of Argentinian racer López. The Hexis AMR Aston Martin pairing of Yann Clairay and Frédéric Makowiecki won both the Qualifying and Championship Races by a considerable margin.

Qualifying

Qualifying result
For qualifying, Driver 1 participates in the first and third sessions while Driver 2 participates in only the second session.  The fastest lap for each session is indicated with bold.

Qualifying Race

Race result

Championship Race

Race result

References

External links
 San Luis GT1 Race in Argentina – FIA GT1 World Championship

San Luis
FIA GT1
FIA GT1 San Luis round